This is a list of Aramaic place names; list of the names of places as they exist in the Aramaic language.

Names









































Aramaic Placename
Lists of place names